Paul Richard William Potier (born July 12, 1954 in Winnipeg, Manitoba, Canada) is a Canadian professional pool player and two-time Canadian nine-ball champion.

Career
Besides being a touring professional, Paul has been a trick shot artist, coach/teacher, tournament director and promoter, league operator, board member of various associations (including past president of the Canadian Professional Billiards Association), pool hall manager/designer/consultant/pro, billiards industry consultant, and referee and referee trainer.

In 2001, he captained Team Canada to a silver medal in the International Team Championships in Taiwan.

In 2005 he represented Canada at the World Games in Germany.

Titles and achievements
Titles and achievements between 1985 and 2007:
 2007 Stan James Canadian Pro Tour event in Kelowna, BC, 2nd place
 2007 Seattle Open Champion, Uncle Jacks Billiards
 2006 Ranked #44 on the IPT Tour
 2005 Represented Canada in the World Games in Germany
 2005 McKittric Open Champion, Raggs Rack Room, Eureka, California
 2005 Pechaur Tour event at Breaktime Billiards, California 2nd place
 2005 Ranked #2 on the Pechaur Tour
 2004 Pechaur Tour Panama Red's Champion
 2004 Pechaur Tour Ballroom Billiards, Langley, BC, 2nd place
 2002 Kanto Open Champion, Shibuya Japan
 2001 Represented Canada in the World Games in Japan
 2001 Captain of team Canada – Silver Medalist in the World Team Nine-ball in Taiwan
 2001 Border Battle, Team Canada member
 2000 CPBA Canadian Nine-ball Champion
 1999 Dufferin Billiards Tour Canadian Nine-ball Champion
 1999 Winner of 8 out of 9 events in the Northwest
 1999 All Japan Championships 3rd Place.
 1998 Canadian Professional Nine-ball Tour – Player of the Year and #1 ranking
 1998 Winner of many events on the CPBA Tour
 1998 Ranked in the top 32 on the RJR Tour in the US
 1997 Canadian Professional Nine-ball Tour - Player of the Year
 1997 Winner of many events on the CPBA Tour
 1996 Canadian Nine-ball Championships, 2nd Place
 1996 Blondie's Open Nine-ball Champion CPBA Tour Event
 1996 Dallas Million Dollar Challenge, PCA, 3rd place
 1996 Triple D Nine-ball Champion
 1996 Ranked #4 on the PCA Tour in the US
 1996 All Japan Championships, 3rd Place
 1993 PBTA World Nine-ball Championships, 3rd place
 1993 All Japan Championships, Amagasaki, Japan 3rd place
 1991 Manitoba Eight-ball Champion
 1991 Manitoba Snooker Champion
 1990 Manitoba Eight-ball Champion
 1989 Manitoba Eight-ball Championships, 2nd place
 1988 Manitoba Eight-ball Championships, 2nd place
 1988 Manitoba Snooker Championships, 2nd place
 1985 Central Canadian English Billiard Champion

Awards
In 2004 he finished the season ranked #2 on the Pechaur Tour. Potier was Canadian Professional Player of the Year twice.

References

1954 births
Living people
Canadian pool players
Sportspeople from Winnipeg
Competitors at the 2005 World Games